dormakaba Holding AG (former Kaba Holding AG) is a global security group based in Rümlang, Switzerland. It employs around 15,000 people in over 50 countries. It formed as the result of a merger between former Kaba and former Dorma in September 2015 and is publicly traded on the SIX Swiss Exchange.

dormakaba generated a turnover of CHF 2.76 billion in financial year 2021/22, a growth of 10.3 % compared to the previous year.

Since 1 January 2022, dormakaba is organized in the three regions Americas, Asia Pacific and Europe & Africa as well as the global Key & Wall Solutions segment.

History 
On 30 April 2015, the family-owned German company Dorma and the Swiss Kaba Group announced their planned merger. After competition authorities approved the merger at the end of August 2015, the dormakaba Group commenced operations on 1 September 2015.

Both companies have a history of over 100 years.

History of Kaba 
In 1862, Franz Bauer founded Kaba in Zurich as a locksmith shop and cash register factory. The firm was sold in 1915 to Leo Bodmer, who renamed the company to Bauer AG. When inventor Fritz Schori created the first cylinder lock with reversible key in 1934, Bauer AG patented the invention and named the lock after the firm's founder Franz Bauer, known in German as 'Kassenbauer' (maker of cash registers) – 'Kaba' for short.

Over the years, the company gradually expanded its portfolio and established itself throughout Europe.  In 1995, Bauer Holding AG was renamed to Kaba Holding AG and the company's shares were listed on the Zurich stock exchange.

With the takeover of Unican Security Systems (Montreal) in 2001, Kaba gained a foothold in North America and added the Silca, Ilco and Kaba Mas brands as part of the merger.

In 2006, the company acquired the Wah Yuet Group in China,  the US company Computerized Security Systems (CSS) with its well-known Saflok and La Gard brands, and the Dutch company H. Cillekens Zn. B.V. In addition, it entered into various joint ventures with the Indian Minda Group.

At Security 2008, Kaba was awarded the «Security Innovation Award» in gold for its newly developed identification technology RCID.

In 2011, Kaba sold the business segment Door Automation (Kaba Gilgen AG, formerly Gilgen AG) to the Japanese Nabtesco Group.

In 2015, the company merged with Dorma.

History of Dorma 

 1908: Foundation of Dörken & Mankel KG  by Wilhelm Dörken and his brother-in-law Rudolf Mankel in Ennepetal (DE.)
 1950: Entry into the door closer business
 1962: Production of the first automatic doors
 1976: Glass fittings are added to the product range
 1978: Production becomes international - first production facility in Singapore (SG)
 1987: Safety solutions and emergency exit control systems
1999: Acquisition of Groom
 2002: New business with mobile partition walls
 2013: More than 1 billion euros annual turnover
 2015: Merger with Kaba

Areas of operation 

 Door hardware
Electronic access and data
Entrance Systems
Mechanical key systems
Safe locks
Lodging systems
Interior glass systems
Key systems
Movable walls

Brands 
dormakaba operates with the following brands worldwide:

 Keyscan
 Best
 Dorma
 Dorma Hüppe
 dormakaba
 Ilco
 Kaba
 Kilargo
 Legic
 Mesker
 Modernfold
 Phi Precision
 Probuck
 RCI
 Saflok La Gard
 Silca
 Skyfold

References

Manufacturing companies of Switzerland
Lock manufacturers
Swiss brands
Manufacturing companies established in 1862
Multinational companies headquartered in Switzerland
Business software companies
Radio-frequency identification companies
Companies listed on the SIX Swiss Exchange
Swiss companies established in 1862
Companies based in the canton of Zürich